Phyllanthus coluteoides is a species of flowering plant in the family Phyllanthaceae, native to west Madagascar and the Mozambique Channel Islands (Juan de Nova Island).

References

coluteoides
Flora of the Mozambique Channel Islands
Flora of Madagascar
Plants described in 1866
Taxa named by Henri Ernest Baillon
Taxa named by Johannes Müller Argoviensis